Bellview Airlines was an airline headquartered at Bellview Plaza in Ikeja, Lagos State, Nigeria. Founded in 1992 and having had 308 employees, it operated scheduled passenger flights within Africa as well as to London out of Murtala Mohammed International Airport, Lagos. The airline was shut down in 2009.

History
In 1992, Bellview Airlines emerged from Bellview Travels Limited, a Lagos-based travel agency, originally concentrating on offering  executive charter services using a single Yakovlev Yak-40 aircraft. In 1993 scheduled domestic passenger services commenced with a leased Douglas DC-9-30. In order to expand further, a subsidiary in Sierra Leone was founded in 1995, which later merged back into its parent company.

The Government of Nigeria set a deadline of April 30, 2007, for all airlines operating in the country to re-capitalise to avoid being grounded, in an effort to ensure better services and safety. Bellview Airlines satisfied the criteria of the Nigerian Civil Aviation Authority (NCAA) and was subsequently re-registered for operation.

In October 2009, Bellview Airlines suspended all operations following the suspension of its London Heathrow services.

Destinations

In July 2009, Bellview Airlines offered scheduled flights to the following destinations:

Africa
 Cameroon
 Douala (Douala International Airport)
 Côte d'Ivoire
 Abidjan (Port Bouet Airport)
 Gabon
 Libreville (Libreville International Airport)
 The Gambia
 Banjul (Banjul International Airport)
 Ghana
 Accra (Kotoka International Airport)
 Guinea
 Conakry (Conakry International Airport)
 Liberia
 Monrovia (Roberts International Airport)
 Nigeria
 Abuja (Nnamdi Azikiwe International Airport) focus city
 Lagos (Murtala Mohammed International Airport) hub
 Kano (Mallam Aminu Kano International Airport)
 Port Harcourt (Port Harcourt International Airport) focus city
 Senegal
 Dakar (Dakar-Yoff-Léopold Sédar Senghor International Airport)
 Sierra Leone
 Freetown (Lungi International Airport)
 South Africa
 Johannesburg (OR Tambo International Airport)

Europe
 United Kingdom
 London (London Heathrow Airport)

Incidents and accidents
On October 22, 2005, Bellview Airlines Flight 210, a Boeing 737-200 aircraft with 117 people on board, crashed shortly after taking off from Murtala Mohammed International Airport en route to Nnamdi Azikiwe International Airport, killing all 117 people on board. Bellview grounded all flights on the next day, but resumed operation again on October 24.
On December 19, 2005, a Boeing 737 operating a Bellview Airlines flight between Lagos and Freetown made an emergency landing at Kotoka International Airport in Accra, Ghana due to hydraulical problems. On the following day, Nigerian authorities ordered all Bellview flights to be grounded and suspended the airline's license until December 22.

Fleet
Over the years, Bellview Airlines operated the following aircraft types:

2 Airbus A300-600 (between 1997 and 2000)
5 Boeing 737-200 (since 2001)
4 Boeing 737-300 (since 2003)
3 Boeing 767-200ER (since 2005, for flights to London)

See also
Airlines of Africa

References

External links

 Bellview Airlines (Archive)

Defunct airlines of Nigeria
Airlines established in 1992
Airlines disestablished in 2009
Defunct companies based in Lagos
2009 disestablishments in Nigeria
Nigerian companies established in 1992